Fürstenberg-Stühlingen was a German county during the Middle Ages. It was located in the territorial landgraviate of Stühlingen. It emerged as a partition of Fürstenberg-Blumberg in 1614. It was partitioned in 1704 between the sons of Count Prosper Ferdinand, with Fürstenberg-Fürstenberg going to Joseph William Ernest and Fürstenberg-Weitra going to his posthumous son, Louis Augustus Egon.

Counts of Fürstenberg-Stühlingen (1614 - 1704)
 Frederick Rudolf of Fürstenburg (1614 - 1655)
 Maximilian Francis (1655 - 1681)
 Leopold Marquard (1681 - 1689) with Prosper Ferdinand (1681 - 1704)

Fürstenberg (princely family)
States and territories established in 1614
Counties of the Holy Roman Empire
1614 establishments in the Holy Roman Empire